Young Jin Cho is an American Christian bishop of the United Methodist Church. He was elected bishop of Southeastern Jurisdiction, Richmond Episcopal Area, at the Southeastern Jurisdictional Conference held July 18–20, 2012, in Lake Junaluska, North Carolina. He is the first Korean-American elected to the episcopacy in the Southeastern Jurisdiction.

Biography

Education 
Cho received his Th.B. and Th.M. from the Methodist Theological Seminary in Seoul, South Korea, and his M.Div. and D.Min. from the Wesley Theological Seminary in Washington, DC.

Personal life 
Cho married Kiok Chang on May 19, 1975, in Seoul, South Korea. They have three children together: Grace, Sophia, and Chris.

References

External links
http://www.vaumc.org/BishopCho

1946 births
American United Methodist bishops
South Korean emigrants to the United States
Living people